The Fall of Italy, is a 1981 Yugoslav war film directed by Lordan Zafranović.

It won the Big Golden Arena for Best Film at the 1981 Pula Film Festival.

Cast

References

External links

The Fall of Italy at Filmski-Programi.hr 

1981 films
Yugoslav war drama films
1980s war drama films
Serbo-Croatian-language films
Films directed by Lordan Zafranović
Jadran Film films
Croatian war drama films
Films set on islands
War films set in Partisan Yugoslavia
1981 drama films
Yugoslav World War II films
Croatian World War II films